This is a list of albums and singles for American rock band Nonpoint.

Albums

Studio albums

Demo albums

Live albums & compilations

Extended plays

Singles

Promotional singles

Music videos

Notes 

A  "In the Air Tonight" did not enter the Billboard Hot 100, but peaked at number seventy on the Digital Song Sales chart, which acts as an extension to the Hot 100.

References 

Rock music group discographies
Discographies of American artists